Penstemon pallidus, the pale beardtongue, is a flower native to the eastern United States. It has been introduced to Canada.

References

Flora of Eastern North America
pallidus